Barbiellinia is a genus of flies in the family Stratiomyidae.

Species
Barbiellinia annulipes (Enderlein, 1921)
Barbiellinia hirta Bezzi, 1922
Barbiellinia lineata (Enderlein, 1921)
Barbiellinia murcicornis (Enderlein, 1921)
Barbiellinia parvicornis (Enderlein, 1921)

References

Stratiomyidae
Brachycera genera
Taxa named by Mario Bezzi
Diptera of South America